Imbi may refer to:

Products
Imbi Bike Saver, soft rubber protective strap for bicycle transport invented in South Africa, 

Places
Imbi Monorail station, monorail station in Bukit Bintang, Kuala Lumpur, Malaysia
Jalan Imbi, road in Kuala Lumpur

People
Imbi Hoop (born 1988), Estonian footballer
Imbi Paju (born 1959), Estonian-Finnish author, journalist and filmmaker
Winis Imbi, Papua New Guinea born Australian rules footballer

Estonian feminine given names